Conrad "Conny" Heidkamp (27 September 1905 – 6 March 1994) was a German footballer who played as a defender for Düsseldorfer SC 99 and Bayern Munich

Between 1927 and 1930, he won 9 caps with the Germany national team, scoring one goal. He was also part of Germany's team at the 1928 Summer Olympics, but he did not play in any matches.

At Bayern Munich, Heidkamp earned captaincy of the team in 1932 via victory over Eintracht Frankfurt in the final, winning the German football championship. He died in 1994 in Munich.

Personal life
Heidkamp met his wife Magdalene in the spring of 1934, and she nicknamed him "grenadier" because of his shot and accuracy.

References

External links
 

1905 births
1994 deaths
Footballers from Düsseldorf
Association football defenders
German footballers
Germany international footballers
FC Bayern Munich footballers
FC Bayern Munich managers
Olympic footballers of Germany
Footballers at the 1928 Summer Olympics
BC Augsburg managers
German football managers
20th-century German people